Matthew Friedman is an American musician, singer and performer.

Early life and education

Friedman is from New York. His family has several other musicians, including three of his siblings.

Career

Friedman played the role of the Piano Man in the first national touring company of the Billy Joel–Twyla Tharp musical, Movin' Out. He served the same role in the show's second national tour.  Friedman left his job as an attorney to take the Piano Man role.

As a songwriter, Friedman has been selected twice as a featured artist at the Alternative Torch Concert Series where Broadway performers play their original compositions. He performs and records his original songs with the Friedman Brothers Band, which includes three of his siblings. In addition to piano, Friednman plays acoustic and 12-string guitars and bass guitar.

References

External links
 Official Myspace

Living people
Musicians from New York City
Male actors from New York City
Year of birth missing (living people)